Th' Dudes are a New Zealand rock band that was formed in the late 1970s in Auckland, New Zealand. Hits include "Walking in Light", "Right First Time", " Be Mine Tonight" and "Bliss".

History

1975–1980
The band was formed by Morris, Urlich, Coleman and Dobbyn, students at Sacred Heart College in Auckland. The band name derived from the "Lone Groover" comic strip in the English music paper, NME. The band's sound was heavily influenced by the British scene, especially The Beatles, David Bowie and The Rolling Stones, and later by the Punk and New Wave sounds of Iggy Pop, Elvis Costello, Nick Lowe, Roxy Music, The Stranglers and The Clash.

Starting off as a covers band that played surf clubs and private parties, Th' Dudes quickly earned a reputation as an energetic and skilful outfit featuring dual guitar work from Dobbyn and Morris, a tight no-nonsense rhythm section (Peter Coleman on bass, later replaced by Lez White, and drummer Bruce Hambling) and charismatic vocalist Urlich. Slowly the repertoire featured more originals and their status rose to the point where Th' Dudes were acclaimed NZ Group of the Year in 1979. The group disbanded in 1980.

1990s-present
The mid-1990s saw a resurgence of interest in Th' Dudes in New Zealand, when "classic hits" and "classic rock" radio became more prevalent, and the compositional, performance and production qualities of the band's records endured. Bliss: 20 Essential New Zealand Classics and other compilations showcased New Zealand post-punk acts which epitomized the Kiwi rock genre. Th' Dudes', "Bliss", attained particular popularity and has since established itself as New Zealand's unofficial national drinking song.

In October 2006, Th' Dudes embarked on a tour of New Zealand as part of Radio Hauraki's 40th anniversary celebrations. The original tour was 11 dates, but quickly expanded to 17 shows due to demand. The band compiled a six-track album of demo and alternate versions of their biggest hits, culled from the band's own collections. This CD was available only at shows on the tour and was called Pubs, Parks, Theatres, Clubs, Church Halls, Gardens, Lounges & Band Rotundas.

In late 2007, Th' Dudes embarked on the "Summer of Love" tour.

In 2008, the band sued Stebbing Studios for non-payment of royalties. The band sought to show that they were not paid royalties for sales of their music due to their songs being recorded in downtime at Stebbing, but studio owner Eldred Stebbing claimed production costs had not been met. The dispute was resolved to both parties' mutual satisfaction in November 2008.

In 2019, the band announced a new tour of New Zealand, with dates from 9–25 April 2020, but it was postponed until November due to the COVID-19 pandemic. Ian Morris's brother, Rikki Morris joined the group for the tour.

Ian Morris died suddenly in Napier on 7 October 2010. Prior to his death, Morris produced records and wrote advertising music, after having had a brief solo career under the stage name Tex Pistol. He is survived by his twin daughters, Julia and Maude.

Members
Dave Dobbyn – vocals, guitars
Ian Morris (deceased) – guitars, keyboards, backing vocals 
Peter Urlich – drums (changing to vocals later) 
Peter Coleman, (Replaced by Lez White 1978) – bass
Bruce Hambling – drums
Rikki Morris

Discography

Studio albums

Live albums

Compilation albums

Demo albums

Singles

Awards and nominations

Aotearoa Music Awards
The Aotearoa Music Awards (previously known as New Zealand Music Awards (NZMA)) are an annual awards night celebrating excellence in New Zealand music and have been presented annually since 1965.

! 
|-
| 2019 || Th' Dudes || New Zealand Music Hall of Fame ||  || 
|-

References

External links
 Th' Dudes homepage
AudioCulture
 Th' Dudes Biography
 Th' Dudes at muzic.net.nz
 Th' Dudes at last.fm
 NZ Music survey

APRA Award winners
New Zealand post-punk music groups
People from Auckland
People educated at Sacred Heart College, Auckland
Musical groups established in 1975
Musical groups disestablished in 1980
Musical groups from Auckland
New Zealand punk rock groups